There have been several referendum bills proposed in 2010:
 Scottish Referendum Bill, 2010, draft bill, later passed in 2013
 2011 United Kingdom Alternative Vote referendum, draft bill, later passed in 2011
 2010 Icelandic loan guarantees referendum's bill (8 January 2010)
 2010 Slovenian border dispute agreement referendum's bill (26 April 2010)
 2010 Turkish constitutional referendum's bill (7 May 2010)